Mathildellidae is family of crabs belonging to the superfamily Goneplacoidea, containing the following genera:
Beuroisia Guinot & Richer de Forges, 1981
†Branchioplax  Rathbun, 1916
†Coeloma  A. Milne-Edwards, 1865
Intesius Guinot & Richer de Forges, 1981
Mathildella Guinot & Richer de Forges, 1981
Neopilumnoplax Serène, 1969
Platypilumnus Alcock, 1894
†Tehuacana  Stenzel, 1944

References

Goneplacoidea
Decapod families